Araberri Basket Club, also known as Sáenz Horeca Araberri for sponsorship reasons, is a basketball team based in Vitoria-Gasteiz, Spain.

History
Founded in 1994. In June 2011, the team promoted to LEB Plata, where it won one Copa LEB Plata and promoted to LEB Oro as winner of the playoffs in 2016.

Despite this achievement, on 23 July 2016 the club announced it could not fulfill the requirements in the league and folded the professional team, maintaining only the youth teams. However, one month later Araberri was allowed to participate in the league and the professional team was reinstated. On 18 July 2017, the club announced it could not fulfill the requirements in the league and it appealed against the decision of FEB. However, they were finally admitted and registered for playing the 2017–18 LEB Oro season.

On July 5, 2019, the club folded the professional team, maintaining only the youth teams.

Logos

Season by season

Trophies and awards

Trophies
Copa LEB Plata: (1)
2012
Liga EBA: (1)
2011
Euskal Kopa: (3)
2013, 2015, 2016

Notable players

To appear in this section a player must have either:
- Set a club record or won an individual award as a professional player.
- Played at least one official international match for his senior national team at any time.
 Artem Tavakalyan
 Mathieu Kamba

References

External links

Basketball teams established in 1994
Sport in Vitoria-Gasteiz
Basque basketball teams
Former LEB Oro teams
Former LEB Plata teams
Former Liga EBA teams